Swiss LNA is the biggest Roller Hockey Clubs Championship in Switzerland.

List of Winners

Number of Swiss National Championships by team

External links

Swiss websites
Federation Suisse de Rink-Hockey

International
 Roller Hockey links worldwide
 Mundook-World Roller Hockey
Hardballhock-World Roller Hockey
Inforoller World Roller Hockey
 World Roller Hockey Blog
rink-hockey-news - World Roller Hockey

Roller hockey in Switzerland
Roller hockey competitions in Switzerland
Switzerland